Hira Gurung is a Nepalese politician and a member of the House of Representatives of the federal parliament of Nepal. He was elected through proportional representation system from Nepali Congress. In the shadow cabinet formed by Nepali Congress, he is a member of Ministry of Women, Children and Senior Citizens.

References

Living people
Nepal MPs 2017–2022
Nepali Congress politicians from Koshi Province
Members of the 1st Nepalese Constituent Assembly
1968 births